Owiesno  is a village in the administrative district of Gmina Dzierżoniów, within Dzierżoniów County, Lower Silesian Voivodeship, in south-western Poland.
The village has a population of 580.

Owiesno was first mentioned as Ovesonovo in a 1260 deed and as Haverdorph in 1292. In 1945 it fell to Poland.

Upon the foundations of an old Knights Templar castle Przecław of Pogorzeli (Pogarell), the Bishop of Wrocław and chancellor of Emperor Charles IV, had a palace erected in the 14th century. It was rebuilt several times and decayed after 1945 so only ruins remain.

The Holy Trinity church was erected about 1583 and received a Boroque equipment including an altar with a Trinity painting about 1730.

References

Owiesno